The Elmer Smith Power Plant was a coal-fired power plant owned and operated by the city of Owensboro, Kentucky.  Unit 1 opened in 1964 with Unit 2 opening 10 years later in 1974

The power plant was the main source of power for the city of Owensboro during the years it was active.

History
As a result of the Owensboro Municipal Utility Commission approving a contract with Big Rivers Electric to supply electricity for Owensboro, Elmer Smith Power Plant closed on June 1, 2020 and was demolished on December 4, 2022, making it two years, six months and three days later after the power plant‘s closure.

Emissions data
2006  Emissions: 2,846,615 tons 
2006  Emissions: 2,525 tons 
2006  Emissions: 7,045 tons 
2005 Mercury Emissions: 59 lb

Controversy 
In 2010, The Clean Air Task Force conducted a study to identify and quantify deaths and other injuries attributed to fine particle pollution from coal-fired power plants and found there to be an estimated 10 deaths annually as a result of fine particle pollution from the Elmer Smith Power Station as well as other negative effects on the health of those affected by the pollutants.

Closing 
In 2019, the city of Owensboro made the landmark decision to close the plant as part of its economic evolution and effort to attract more tourism (5) By closing the plant, the city plans on switching primarily to solar power by 2022 by purchasing energy from the Ashwood Solar Station  which is set to open in Lyon County, Kentucky

See also

Coal mining in Kentucky
Owensboro, Kentucky
 Coal-fired power station
 Solar power in Kentucky

References

External links
 Official website

Energy infrastructure completed in 1964
Coal-fired power plants in Kentucky